Patricia Lake is a lake in Jasper National Park, Alberta, Canada, near the town of Jasper. It was named for Princess Patricia of Connaught, a granddaughter of Queen Victoria.

It is connected by Pyramid Lake road and hiking trails to the town of Jasper, as well as other tourist sites such as Pyramid Lake and Pyramid Mountain.

Project Habbakuk 
Patricia Lake is notable for its involvement during World War II with Project Habbakuk, a plan to build an unsinkable aircraft carrier from an ice-based composite material termed "Pykrete".

Initial studies of natural lake ice had been carried out at Lake Louise. In January 1943, Patricia Lake was chosen as the test site for building a prototype vessel. In fact, the beam was to approximately this scale, but the length was only 60 feet, about a third of scale.

Patricia Lake was chosen for this work on account of having rail connections at Jasper and being a suitably cold, remote area that already had military training involvement in the area as camouflage. There were also Mennonite and Doukhobor communities nearby, religious conscientious objectors, who could provide the labour needed.

Pykrete construction material for the full-sized ship was to be a composite of ice and sawdust, maintained by refrigeration. The first experiments had used natural lake ice, in a Canadian winter. The model ship was to use plain ice, but partly natural and partly refrigerated. Construction proceeded through March 1943 by building a wooden cabin on the frozen lake, installing refrigeration equipment and a nest of 6 inch cold air ducts, and then increasing the height of the ice wall around the cabin. As weight increased, the bottom of the "hull" was sawn free from the lake ice and the model floated free. In June the refrigeration was switched off, but the model lasted the whole summer before melting and sinking.

Although the refrigeration equipment was removed before sinking, the wooden walls of the hull, an "incredible jumble" of cold air ductwork and also a great quantity of the bitumen used as part of the insulation remained at the site.
An underwater plaque at the site notes its part in World War II history.

The site continues to be visited by recreational divers. The wreckage has deteriorated in recent years and has suffered from vandalism and graffiti.

References 

Jasper National Park
Lakes of Alberta